The Barnabas Fund is an international, interdenominational Christian aid agency based in Coventry, in the West Midlands of England that supports Christians who face discrimination or persecution as a consequence of their faith. It was established in 1993 and channels aid to projects run by national Christians in more than 50 countries.  It also campaigns in particular for the abolition of the Islamic apostasy law. The headquarters is based at The Rectory in Pewsey, Wiltshire.

See also 
Persecution of Christians

References

External links
Barnabas Fund Official site
Bi-monthly magazine

Evangelical parachurch organizations
Organisations based in Coventry
1993 establishments in England
Religion in Warwickshire